Aksa Beach is a popular beach and a vacation spot in Aksa village in Malad, Mumbai, India. It is situated close to Marvé Beach. It is a popular weekend destination. It is dotted with many private cottages and hotels, some of which are rented out to tourists and visitors. Aksa beach also happens to  be one of the cleanest beaches in the city of Mumbai

This beach has INS Hamla (a base of the Indian Navy) at one end and a small beach called "Dana Paani".

Transport
It is accessible from Malad (West) station by select BEST buses from Borivali railway station, en route to Madh Island, and also by private transport and auto rickshaws. Cabs services like Ola and Uber are also available. The beach is approximately 9 km from Malad station and 12 km from Borivali. It can also be reached from Andheri (West) railway station. Buses from Andheri Station go to Versova Village. From there a boat takes passengers across the sea to Madh Island. On Madh Island bus numbers 269 and 271 go to Aksa Beach. Visitors often complain about the rush and crowds due to less availability of the BEST busses in the evenings.

Safety 
It is not safe to swim as the currents are strong and the sands of the beach keep shifting because of the waves and people often misjudge them. Warning signs of swimming prohibition have been put on the beach and lifeguards have been appointed, however accidents are common, due to rapidly changing tides, and merging to two tide currents on the rocky beach and people ignoring warnings. The beach gets even more dangerous during Monsoon season, though  15,000 people are visiting the beach during weekends.
Quicksand is also found in the waters, often causing danger.

Drowning incident 
Aksa Beach, located in Mumbai, India, has been identified as one of the beaches with the highest number of drowning incidents. Records indicate that between 2006 and 2018, an average of 38 people drowned every year due to drowning incidents, while 445 individuals were rescued after near-drowning experiences and 45 lost their lives during 2006-2018. In total, 15 drowning spots have been identified along the beach, with the highest number of incidents occurring in 2007. Pre-monsoon season, which coincides with the peak summer vacation period, is when the beach sees the greatest number of incidents, owing to the large crowds that gather there.

See also
 Marvé Beach
Juhu Beach

References

Beaches of Mumbai